Ban Laemphrathat (Thai: บ้านแหลมพระธาตุ) is a village (muban) in the Nakhon Pa Mak subdistrict of Bang Krathum District of Phitsanulok Province, Thailand.

Etymology
This village takes the name from its temple Wat Laemphrathat (Thai:  วัดแหลมพระธาตุ).  The first element, wat (Thai: วัด), means 'temple'.  The second element, laem (Thai: แหลม), means 'sharp' or 'pointy'.  The third element, phra (Thai: พระ), means 'monk' or image of Buddha. The fourth element, that (Thai: ธาตุ), means 'essence'.  As a whole, the temple's name loosely translates to 'Temple of the Sharp Buddha Relic', and accordingly the name of the town village means 'Village of the Sharp Buddha Relic'.

Geography
Ban Laemphrathat is in the eastern portion of Nakhon Pa Mak.

Wat Laemphrathat
This Theravada Buddhist temple is said to enshrine a relic of the Buddha.  It is also the location of one of Nakhon Pa Mak's four elementary schools, Wat Laemphrathat School.

References

External links
Wat Laemphrathat on WebWat.net (Thai)

Populated places in Phitsanulok province